The girls' singles tournament of the 2006 US Open was won by Anastasia Pavlyuchenkova, who beat Tamira Paszek in the final by 3–6, 6–4, 7–5.

Victoria Azarenka was the reigning champion, but she did not defend her title in the juniors this year, having already been elevated to the seniors.

Seeds

Draw

Finals

Top half

Section 1

Section 2

Bottom half

Section 3

Section 4

Qualifying draw

Qualifier 1

Qualifier 2

Qualifier 3

Qualifier 4

Qualifier 5

Qualifier 6

Qualifier 7

Qualifier 8

References

Girl's Singles
US Open, 2006 Girls' Singles